Allan Gordon Chappelow FRSA (20 August 1919 – May/June 2006) was an English writer and photographer who lived in Hampstead, north London. He wrote books on George Bernard Shaw and specialised in portraits of writers and musicians. He was found dead at his house in 2006 and a Chinese national, Wang Yam, was convicted of his murder at a retrial in 2009.

Life
Chappelow was the son of wealthy decorator, upholsterer, and later fine art consultant) Archibald Cecil Chappelow, and Karen Ragnhild Permin of Hillerød, north of Copenhagen, whom his father had met while working as a lecturer Copenhagen University. Chappelow moved with his family to Hampstead at the age of 14, to the house, 9 Downshire Hill, in which he lived for the rest of his life except for his school and student years. He was educated at Oundle School near Peterborough. In the Second World War he was a conscientious objector (as his uncle, Eric Chappelow, had famously been in the First World War), working on a farm in Hampshire. He went on to study moral sciences at Trinity College, Cambridge between 1946 and 1949, taking an M.A. and twice being a prizeman. In the 1950s he worked as a photographer for the Daily Mail and The Daily Telegraph. Afterwards he became a freelance photographer and writer.

As a photographer, Chappelow specialised in portraits of leading literary and theatrical figures and musicians. In 1950 he visited George Bernard Shaw at Ayot St. Lawrence and took the last known photographs of the playwright. Chappelow's books included Russian Holiday (London, George Harrap, 1955) – he was a member of the first party of 'ordinary tourists' to be allowed to visit the USSR after the Second World War. His principal works on Shaw are Shaw the Villager and Human Being – a Biographical symposium, with a preface by Dame Sybil Thorndike (1962), and Shaw – the 'Chucker-Out''' (1969).

A recluse and (according to media reports) a millionaire, the elderly Chappelow was found murdered in his house after a sum of money was discovered to have gone missing from his bank account. In October 2006, a British citizen of Chinese birth, Wang Yam, a financial trader also resident in Hampstead, was arrested in Switzerland and charged with the murder.

Chappelow's Grade II listed house was sold for £4.1m, and the new owners submitted plans for it to be refurbished.

Chappelow was buried with his parents on the east side of Highgate Cemetery.

Legal and 'security' issues 

First trial
In December 2007, the Crown Prosecution Service indicated it would ask for Wang's trial for murder, burglary and deception to be held 'in camera'. This would make it the first UK murder trial ever heard behind closed doors without access by press or public.

A Public Interest Immunity (PII) certificate was sought by the Home Secretary Jacqui Smith; it was reported by The Times on 13 December 2007 that the grounds were 'on the basis of protecting national security interests and to protect the identity of informants'. On 14 January 2008, the trial judge granted this unprecedented 'gagging order' and the trial was scheduled to start on 28 January. A further order was made under the Contempt of Court Act 1981 prohibiting the press from any speculation as to the reasons for parts of the trial being held in private.

In the Court of Appeal on 28 January, the 'gagging order' was upheld, with the Lord Chief Justice insisting that a fair trial would be possible even if some or all of it was held 'in camera'. However, there was coverage of the actual criminal trial which opened on Monday, 4 February as scheduled. The coverage included details of both the victim and of the defendant in the media and there was little or no discussion of the fact that the proceedings would at least in part be held in camera. There was no evidence that the delay in publishing the judgement was deliberate or the result of another gagging order which the media had been instructed not to report.

On 28 March, the jury retired to consider its verdict. On 31 March, Yam was found guilty of stealing £20,000 by deception, and on 1 April also found guilty of handling stolen goods. The jury was discharged after failing to reach verdicts on the charges of burglary and murder.

One of the theories put forward, and confirmed by "sources close to the investigation", is that Wang was a "low-level informant" for the security services and planned to rely on this as part of his defence at trial. Other theories suggest that the evidence presented by the Crown risked revealing the methods and capabilities of the security services.

Wang had declared bankruptcy in September 2004, and was believed to be having financial difficulties; he had been due to be evicted from his house for rent arrears in June 2006. Wang was a student leader in the Tiananmen Square protests of 1989, and had fled China for Hong Kong in 1992.

Retrial
A retrial of Wang Yam was set for 13 October 2008. The prosecution presented eight weeks of evidence in public. This evidence included CCTV footage of Yam using Chappelow's bank card, and evidence of Yam paying a restaurant bill. The entirety of the defence case in the retrial was held in camera.

The Old Bailey judge overseeing the case spent early January 2009 summarising the case, before sending out the jury to deliberate on 9 January. Yam was convicted of murder on 16 January 2009; he was sentenced to life imprisonment, serving a minimum of 20 years.

Book

In January 2018 a book on Chappelow and the murder trial was published: Thomas Harding's Blood On The Page'', William Heinemann (London, 2018).

References

1919 births
2006 deaths
Burials at Highgate Cemetery
British conscientious objectors
Murder in London
Photographers from London
British non-fiction writers
English criminal law
English murder victims
People murdered in London
2006 crimes in the United Kingdom
People educated at Oundle School
People from Copenhagen
Photographers from Copenhagen
Alumni of Trinity College, Cambridge
British male writers
20th-century non-fiction writers
Male non-fiction writers
Danish emigrants to the United Kingdom